The Twelve Pound Look is a 1920 British silent drama film directed by Jack Denton and starring Milton Rosmer, Jessie Winter and Ann Elliott.

Plot
A woman marries a cold, wealthy businessmen in order to be able to financially support her younger brothers and sisters. She later saves up enough money to buy a typewriter and leaves her husband to work independently as a writer.

Main cast
 Milton Rosmer - Harry Sims 
 Jessie Winter - Kate Sims 
 Ann Elliott - Emma Sims 
 Nelson Ramsey - Jack Lamb 
 Athalie Davis - Anne
 Alfred Wellesley - Bernard Roche 
 E. Story Gofton - The Rector 
 Roy Byford - Sir William Crackley 
 Leonard Robson - Mr. Moon 
 Eric Hardin - Charles 
 Jose Shannon - Mabel

Production
The film was made by the Ideal Film Company, one of the leading British studios of the silent era. It is based on the play The Twelve Pound Look by J.M. Barrie.  It received its trade show on 20 September 1920.

Bibliography
 Low, Rachael. The History of British Film, Volume 4 1918-1929. Routledge, 1997.

References

External links
 

1920 films
British silent feature films
Films directed by Jack Denton
1920 drama films
British films based on plays
Ideal Film Company films
British drama films
British black-and-white films
1920s English-language films
1920s British films
Silent drama films